Lothar Kalinowsky (December 28, 1899 in Berlin – June 28, 1992 in New York) was an American psychiatrist best known for advocating electroconvulsive therapy.

He contributed to the second edition of the Diagnostic and Statistical Manual of Mental Disorders.

References

1899 births
American psychiatrists
Commanders Crosses of the Order of Merit of the Federal Republic of Germany
1992 deaths